Jerry Berlongieri is an American electronic musician, producer, designer, director, and a score composer for video games. He is known for his work as a composer for Descent 3, Alter Echo and Overload and as an Audio Director on Spider-Man, James Bond 007, Call of Duty and Skylanders.

Composer 
 Descent 3 Original Soundtrack (1999)
 Evenings At The Microscope (1999)
 Alter Echo Original Soundtrack (2003)
 Descent Mercenary Original Soundtrack
 Descent 3
 Goalie Fritz
 Rubu Tribe (unfinished)
 Overload (2018)

Sound Department 

 Rachet and Clank: Rift Apart (2021)
 Spider-Man Miles Morales (2020)
 Overload (2018)	 	
 Quantum Break (2016)	 		
 Project Spark (2014)	 	
 Adera (2012)	 	
 Skylanders: Spyro's Adventure (2011)	 		
 007: Blood Stone (2010)	 	
 Blur (2010)	 	
 Call of Duty: Black Ops (2010)	 	
 DJ Hero 2 (2010)	 	
 GoldenEye 007 (2010)	 		
 Shrek Forever After: The Final Chapter (2010)	 	
 Tony Hawk: Shred (2010)	 	
 Transformers: War for Cybertron (2010)	 	
 007: Quantum of Solace (2008)	 	
 Call of Duty: World at War (2008)	 	
 Spider-Man 3 (2007)	 	
 Call of Duty 3 (2006)	 	
 Ultimate Spider-Man (2005)	 	
 Ultimate Spider-Man (Limited Edition) (2005)	 	
 Alter Echo (2003)	 	
 Descent³ (1999)	 	
 Descent³ / Descent³: Mercenary (1999)	 	
 Disney's Animated Storybook: 101 Dalmatians (1997)	 
 Disney's Animated Storybook: Hercules (1997)	 	
 Magic Fairy Tales: Barbie as Rapunzel (1997)	 	
 Tonka Search & Rescue (1997)	 	
 Disney's Animated Storybook: The Hunchback of Notre Dame (1996)	 	
 Disney's Animated Storybook: Pocahontas (1995)	 	
 Disney's Animated Storybook: Winnie the Pooh (1995)

References

External links 
 
 Jerry Berlongieri at Magnatune

American male composers
21st-century American composers
American electronic musicians
Video game composers
Year of birth missing (living people)
Living people
21st-century American male musicians